Trevor Stewart may refer to:
 Trevor Stewart (sprinter) (born 1997), American Olympic athlete
 Trevor Stewart (cricketer) (1940–2020), Australian cricketer

See also
 Trevor Stewardson (born 1977), Canadian boxer